Bokon may refer to:

Bokon, a lake in Khabarovsk Krai, Russia
Princess Bokon (1818 - 1832), a Korean princess
Bokon District, an administrative division of Liberia